ORW may refer to:

Ohio Reformatory for Women
Operation Red Wings
Ormara Airport
Endoglin